Michael George Binns (born 12 August 1988) is a Jamaican footballer who most recently played for Stumptown Athletic in the National Independent Soccer Association and the Jamaica national football team.

Career

International goals
Scores and results list Jamaica's goal tally first.

Club 

Binns played for Portmore United in Jamaica. He went abroad on loan deal to play with York Region Shooters in the Canadian Soccer League. In July 2016, Binns signed with the Wilmington Hammerheads in USL. In 2017, Binns returned to Portmore United. In 2018, Binns signed for USL side Tulsa Roughnecks.

In August 2019, Binns joined National Independent Soccer Association club Stumptown Athletic.

International career 
Binns made his international debut for Jamaica at the 2016 Copa América against Venezuela on 5 June 2016, coming on as an 86th-minute substitute for Giles Barnes.

Honors

References

External links

1988 births
Living people
Association football forwards
Jamaican footballers
Jamaica international footballers
Portmore United F.C. players
York Region Shooters players
Wilmington Hammerheads FC players
FC Tulsa players
Stumptown AC players
USL Championship players
Copa América Centenario players
2017 CONCACAF Gold Cup players
National Premier League players
Canadian Soccer League (1998–present) players
National Independent Soccer Association players
Jamaican expatriate footballers
Expatriate soccer players in the United States
Jamaican expatriate sportspeople in the United States
Expatriate soccer players in Canada
Jamaican expatriate sportspeople in Canada